Roland and Almita Vamos  are a husband and wife who are violin and viola instructors. The Vamoses have been recognized at the White House seven times and were named Distinguished Teachers by the National Endowment for the Arts. They have been honored by the American String Teachers Association (ASTA) with the Distinguished Service Award, and showcased on CBS' Sunday Morning News.

Roland Vamos was born July 20, 1930. He studied with Oscar Shumsky and William Lincer at the Juilliard School. Almita Vamos was born September 16, 1938, and studied with Mischa Mischakoff and Louis Persinger at the Juilliard School. A performing artist, she won the Concert Artist Guild award in New York City along with other prizes.

The Vamoses are members of the faculty at the Music Institute of Chicago and the Chicago College of Performing Arts. Prior to their positions at the Chicago College of Performing Arts, they were on faculty at Northwestern University, Oberlin Conservatory of Music, the University of Minnesota, Western Illinois University, University of Kentucky, and Antioch College.

Orchestra Positions held by their students 
 New York Philharmonic
 Metropolitan Opera
 Chicago Symphony Orchestra
 Boston Symphony Orchestra
 Philadelphia Orchestra
 San Francisco Symphony
 The Cleveland Orchestra
 Los Angeles Philharmonic
 St. Louis Symphony Orchestra
 Indianapolis Symphony Orchestra
 Minnesota Orchestra
 Saint Paul Chamber Orchestra
 Hong Kong Philharmonic Orchestra
 Oslo Philharmonic
 Seattle Symphony
 Singapore Symphony Orchestra
 Iceland Symphony
 Colorado Symphony Orchestra
 Copenhagen Symphony Orchestra
 Milwaukee Symphony Orchestra
 Kansas City Symphony
 National Symphony Orchestra
 Oregon Symphony Orchestra
San Antonio Symphony Orchestra

References

Roosevelt University faculty
Vamos, Almita and Roland
Vamos, Almita and Roland
Fiorello H. LaGuardia High School alumni
Vamos, Almita and Roland
Living people
Educators from New York City
21st-century classical violinists
21st-century American male musicians
Year of birth missing (living people)
Male classical violinists
21st-century American violinists